Vibeke Hastrup (born 7 April 1958 in Denmark) is a Danish actress who has worked in theatre, television and film. She performed in the films Babette's Feast and Dance of the Polar Bears, and has done numerous voice-overs for animated features such as Tarzan, Robots and Wallace & Gromit: The Curse of the Were-Rabbit.

Biography 
Hastrup graduated from the Danish National School of Theatre in Copenhagen. The following year she debuted at Det Ny Teater in Copenhagen in the comedy Goddag, er De min Far? (English: Hello, are you my Father?). She has performed on many of the Copenhagen stages, including in Heksejagt and Parasitterne at the Folketeatret as well as Play It Again, Sam at the Bellevue and Det Danske Theaters.

Hastrup debuted on screen in 1982 in Sven Methling's Kidnapping. Five years later she played the role of the young Martina in Babette's Feast (Babettes gæstebud). Hastrup appeared in other films including Dance of the Polar Bears which won both Bodil and Robert awards for Best Danish Film of 1990. Hastrup also has appeared in 6 Danish television series and lent her voice to the Danish versions of Lady and the Tramp II, Toy Story 2, and Tarzan.

Filmography

Films

Television 

 Én stor familie (1982–1983)
 Gøngehøvdingen (1991–1992)
  (1998-1998)
  (1998–2002)
 Rejseholdet (2000–2003)
 Ørnen (2004)
 Forbrydelsen (2007)

Notes

References 
 Piils, Morten, Vibeke Hastrup, Danske filmskuespillere, Gyldendal, (2003)
 Vibeke Hastrup at The Danish Film Database

External links 
 Det Danske Filminstitut
 Vibeke Hastrup at The Danish Film Database
 

1958 births
Danish film actresses
Danish television actresses
Living people
People from Ringkøbing-Skjern Municipality